The St James's Hotel and Club is a hotel at 7-8, Park Place, St. James's, London SW1A 1LP and is part of Pakistani multinational conglomerate Nishat Group, owned by Mian Mohammad Mansha.

The hotel has fifty-six rooms and twelve suites, many of which have their own terraces, plus a penthouse with a party deck for sixty people.

History
The current hotel describes itself as having "first opened its doors, as a gentlemen's chamber for the English aristocracy, in 1892".  At that time the original St James's Club was elsewhere, and the buildings at 7-8 Park Place were erected as blocks of flats in 1891-92. They were originally planned with forty-four sets of residential chambers, plus service rooms. The sporting Sir John Dugdale Astley, 3rd Baronet, died in his chambers at 7, Park Place, 10 October 1894.

Before the building's construction, a club known as the Field Club operated at the 7 Park Place address in 1889. On 13 May of that year, police raided the club and found baccarat in progress. Twenty-one persons were arrested, "among whom were three English and several French and Belgian noblemen..." Among those arrested were the Earl of Dudley (later Governor-General of Australia), William Brownlow, 3rd Baron Lurgan, son of Charles Brownlow, 2nd Baron Lurgan, 'Lord Paulet' (probably a son of the 15th Marquess of Winchester) and Baron Ferraro.

By 1960, the 7-8 Park Place flats were being called Old St James's House, a name apparently without historical support. In the spring of 2008, following extensive renovation, the building was reopened as 'The St James's Hotel and Club'. Within the hotel is the renovated and repurposed space St James's Club founded by Peter de Savary, who marketed it to resonate with the panache associated with the historic St James's Club founded in 1857 by Earl Granville and the Marchese d'Azeglio. The team of the St James’s Hotel and Club received the Olympic torch on the day before the opening of the Games.

On 5 November 2010, Pakistani Nishat Group bought the hotel for £60 million.

Footnotes

External links
Official website

Hotels in London
Buildings and structures in the City of Westminster
1892 establishments in the United Kingdom
Commercial buildings completed in 1892
Nishat Group
2017 mergers and acquisitions
St James's